Aungmyethazan District or Aungmyaythazan District is the district of Mandalay Region, Myanmar. Partly included under Mandalay City Development Committee and Mandalay. Its principal township is Aungmyaythazan.

Townships

The townships, cities, towns that are included in Aungmyaythazan District are as follows:
Aungmyethazan Township 
Patheingyi Township
Patheingyi
Madaya Township
Madaya

History
On April 30, 2022, new districts were expanded and organized. Aungmyethazan Township and Patheingyi Township from Mandalay District and Madaya Township from Pyinoolwin District were formed as Aungmyethazan District. This district is part of the Mandalay metropolitan area.

References

Districts of Myanmar
Mandalay Region